San Francisco is a small town, in Costilla County, Colorado, United States.

In 1853–54, San Francisco was established, and is as one of the earliest settlements in the San Luis Valley. About nine miles southeast of San Luis, it was settled by Hispanic settlers along San Francisco Creek. San Francisco and named after the town's patron saint, St. Francis.

San Francisco is the site of Iglesia de San Francisco de Assisi, listed on the National Register of Historic Places.

The Sangre de Cristo Mountains are nearby.

See also

 Great Sand Dunes National Park and Preserve
 Outline of Colorado
 Index of Colorado-related articles
 National Register of Historic Places listings in Costilla County, Colorado
 San Francisco volcanic field

References

External links
 A church in San Francisco
 Weather in San Francisco
 A website about San Francisco

Towns in Costilla County, Colorado
Towns in Colorado